Canaan T. Severin (born March 16, 1993) is a former American football wide receiver. He played college football at Virginia. Severin is also an aspiring Film Producer, whose short film, "Lean In" has been nominated for Boston Film Festival.

Professional career

Pittsburgh Steelers
Severin signed with the Pittsburgh Steelers as an undrafted free agent on April 30, 2016. He was placed on injured reserve on August 5, 2016, with a shoulder injury.

Severin was released on May 2, 2017, only to be re-signed on May 17, 2017. In the Steelers' preseason opener against the New York Giants on August 11, he caught 2 passes on 4 targets for 24 yards. He was later released on August 14, 2017.

New York Giants
On August 18, 2017, Severin signed with the New York Giants. He was waived on September 2, 2017. He was re-signed to the Giants' practice squad on December 27, 2017. He signed a reserve/future contract with the Giants on January 1, 2018. He was waived by the Giants on May 7, 2018.

References

1993 births
Living people
American football wide receivers
Virginia Cavaliers football players
Pittsburgh Steelers players
New York Giants players
Players of American football from Massachusetts
People from Marlborough, Massachusetts
Sportspeople from Middlesex County, Massachusetts